The head of Somerville College, University of Oxford, is the Principal. The current principal is Janet Royall, Baroness Royall of Blaisdon who took up the appointment in August 2017, succeeding Alice Prochaska.

References

Somerville Principals
 
Somerville